Héctor Lechuga (18 April 1927 – 13 July 2017) was a Mexican actor, comedian, political commentarist and radio personality.

Lechuga died of a heart attack after suffering from Alzheimer's disease at his home in México. City, at the age of 90.

Filmography
 Buenas Noches Año Nuevo (1964)
 El Dengue del Amor (1965)
 La Muerte es Puntual (1964)
 Detectives O Ladrones (1966)
 Réquiem por un Canalla (1967)
 La Muerte a Seis Litros (1962)
 El Tigre Negro (1965)
 Bang Bang y al Hoyo  (1971)
 Las Fuerzas Vivas (1975)
 La Disputa (1969)
 México 2000 (1983)
 Rapiña (1982)

References

1929 births
2017 deaths
People from Orizaba
Male actors from Veracruz
Mexican male film actors
Mexican male comedians
Mexican male television actors
Mexican radio presenters
20th-century Mexican male actors